
Year 300 BC was a year of the pre-Julian Roman calendar. At the time it was known as the Year of the Consulship of Corvus and Pansa (or, less frequently, year 454 Ab urbe condita). The denomination 300 BC for this year has been used since the early medieval period, when the Anno Domini calendar era became the prevalent method in Europe for naming years. B.C.E is the abbreviation for before the Common/Current/Christian Era (an alternative to Before Christ, abbreviated BC).

Events 
 By place 

 Greece 
 Pilgrims travel to the healing temples of Asclepieion to be cured of their ills. After a ritual purification the followers bring offerings or sacrifices.

 Egypt 
 Pyrrhus, the King of Epirus, is taken as a hostage to Egypt after the Battle of Ipsus and makes a diplomatic marriage with the princess Antigone, daughter of Ptolemy and Berenice.
 Ptolemy concludes an alliance with King Lysimachus of Thrace and gives him his daughter Arsinoe II in marriage.

 China 
 Warring States period

 Seleucid Empire 
 Seleucus founds the city of Antioch, some 20 miles up the Orontes River, naming it after his father.
 After the death of his wife Apama, Seleucus marries Stratonice, daughter of Demetrius Poliorcetes.

 By topic 

 Art 
 In Pella, the capital of Macedonia, the artist Gnosis creates his Stag Hunt mosaic floor decoration.

Births

Deaths

References